Philip K. Kimball (June 6, 1918 – September 5, 2005) was an American lawyer and politician.

Born in Springfield, Massachusetts, Kimball graduated from Classical High School. He served in the United States Army during World War II. Kimball received his law degree from Northeastern University School of Law and practiced law in Springfield. Kimball served in the Massachusetts House of Representatives from 1949 to 1969 and was a Republican. Kimball died at Hartford Hospital in Hartford, Connecticut.

See also
 Massachusetts legislature: 1949–1950, 1951–1952, 1953–1954, 1955–1956

Notes

External links

1918 births
2005 deaths
Politicians from Springfield, Massachusetts
Northeastern University School of Law alumni
Massachusetts lawyers
Republican Party members of the Massachusetts House of Representatives
20th-century American politicians
20th-century American lawyers